Ballindangan is a village in County Cork in Ireland.  It has a handball alley, a Roman Catholic church (Church of the Immaculate Conception), a primary school (Ballindangan National School), an association football team, and a community centre. Its railway station was closed in 1947.

Located to the south is Kileenemer Church, a medieval church and national monument.

Ballindangan is within the Cork East Dáil constituency, and lies in the ecclesiastical parish of Glanworth, Ballindangan and Curraghagalla.

References

Towns and villages in County Cork